In physics, the distorted Schwarzschild metric is the metric of a standard/isolated Schwarzschild spacetime exposed in external fields. In numerical simulation, the Schwarzschild metric can be distorted by almost arbitrary kinds of external energy–momentum distribution. However, in exact analysis, the mature method to distort the standard Schwarzschild metric is restricted to the framework of Weyl metrics.

Standard Schwarzschild as a vacuum Weyl metric

All static axisymmetric solutions of the Einstein–Maxwell equations can be written in the form of Weyl's metric,

From the Weyl perspective, the metric potentials generating the standard Schwarzschild solution are given by

 

where

 

which yields the Schwarzschild metric in Weyl's canonical coordinates that

Weyl-distortion of Schwarzschild's metric

Vacuum Weyl spacetimes (such as Schwarzschild) respect the following field equations,

 
 
 
 

where  is the Laplace operator.

Derivation of vacuum field equations. The vacuum Einstein's equation reads , which yields Eqs(5.a)-(5.c).

Moreover, the supplementary relation  implies Eq(5.d). End derivation.

Eq(5.a) is the linear Laplace's equation; that is to say, linear combinations of given solutions are still its solutions. Given two solutions  to Eq(5.a), one can construct a new solution via

and the other metric potential can be obtained by

 

Then,  constructed via  
Eqs(6)(7) leads to the superposed Schwarzschild-Weyl metric

 

With the transformations

 
 

one can obtain the superposed Schwarzschild metric in the usual  coordinates,

 

The superposed metric Eq(10) can be regarded as the standard Schwarzschild metric distorted by external Weyl sources. In the absence of distortion potential , Eq(10) reduces to the standard Schwarzschild metric

Weyl-distorted Schwarzschild solution in spherical coordinates

Similar to the exact vacuum solutions to Weyl's metric in spherical coordinates, we also have series solutions to Eq(10). The distortion potential  in Eq(10) is given by the multipole expansion

  with 

where

 

The other potential  is

See also

Weyl metrics
 Schwarzschild metric

References

Black holes
General relativity
Exact solutions in general relativity